Gary MacDonald may refer to:

Gary MacDonald (footballer) (born 1979), English footballer
Gary MacDonald (swimmer) (born 1953), Canadian swimmer
Gary Macdonald, a fictional character on the TV program Saturday Night Live

See also
Gary McDonald (disambiguation)
Garry MacDonald, English footballer
Garry McDonald (born 1948), Australian actor